"Time, Love and Tenderness" is a song written by Diane Warren and performed by American recording artist Michael Bolton. Released as a single from his seventh album of the same title (1991), the song reached number seven on the US Billboard Hot 100 chart, becoming Bolton's fifth top-ten single in the United States. It was also the singer's fourth song to top the Billboard Hot Adult Contemporary Tracks chart. Worldwide the song reached number four in Canada, number 27 in Sweden and number 28 in the United Kingdom.

Critical reception
Pan-European magazine Music & Media wrote that "this ear-grabbing semi-ballad [...] will absolutely invoke a positive reaction from your audience."

Personnel
Michael Bolton - vocals
Walter Afanasieff - synthesized bass, keyboards, synthesizers, drums, percussion
Michael Landau - electric guitar
 Gary Cirimelli - Synclavier programming
 Ren Klyce - Akai AX60 and Fairlight CMI programming
 Greg "Gigi" Gonaway - timbales
 Kitty Beethoven, Larry Batiste, Sandy Griffith, Chris Hawkins, Jeanie Tracy, Michael Bolton - backing vocals

Charts

Weekly charts

Year-end charts

References

Whitburn, Joel (1996). The Billboard Book of Top 40 Hits, 6th Edition (Billboard Publications)

1991 singles
1991 songs
Michael Bolton songs
Songs written by Diane Warren
Song recordings produced by Walter Afanasieff
Columbia Records singles